A580 may refer to:

 A580 road (England)
 Canon PowerShot A580, a camera
 DSLR-A580 aka α580, a digital SLR with A-mount in the Sony Alpha camera system